Bence Penke (born November 9, 1994) is a Hungarian voice actor from Budapest, the capital of Hungary.

Penke contributes to voicing characters that appears in movies, cartoons, anime, and live action shows. He is best known as the Hungarian voice of Phineas Flynn in the Hungarian version of Disney Channel animated series Phineas and Ferb. He also voices Konohamaru,a supporting character in the Animax Hungarian version of popular anime series Naruto. He also voice Konohamaru in the Jetix Hungarian version.

Dubbing Contributions

Anime and animation
 Konohamaru in Naruto (Jetix and Animax editions)
 Mitsuhiko Tsuburaya in Detective Conan
 Baron Leltoy in Bakugan Battle Brawlers: New Vestroia
 Gorganzola in Chowder
 Phineas Flynn in Phineas and Ferb
 Phineas Flynn/Phineas-2 in Phineas and Ferb the Movie: Across the 2nd Dimension
 Mac (Second voice) in Foster's Home for Imaginary Friends
 Pantalaimon in The Golden Compass
 Dashiell "Dash" Robert Parr in The Incredibles
 Pazu in Castle in the Sky
 Adam Lyon in My Gym Partner's a Monkey
 Sam Kincaid in Inazuma Eleven

Live action shows
 Malcolm in Malcolm in the Middle
 Sam Camden in 7th Heaven
 Sam Camden in 7th Heaven
 Tom Marvolo Riddle (teenager) in Harry Potter and the Half-Blood Prince
 Jared Grace and Simon Grace in The Spiderwick Chronicles
 Nicky Daley in Night at the Museum
 Jake Harper in Two and a Half Men
 Joey Naylor in Thank You for Smoking
 Jacob Black in Twilight
 George Llewelyn Davies in Finding Neverland
 PJ Duncan in Good Luck Charlie
 Elliot Gilbert (Second voice) in H2O: Just Add Water (Second dub)
 Rico Suave (First voice) in Hannah Montana
 Preston in Super 8
 Budderball in Air Buddies
 Buddha in Snow Buddies
 Paul Blaine in The Canterville Ghost
 Jake in Single Santa seeks Mrs Claus'''
 Tom in Malabar Princess Conor in Gamer's Guide to Pretty Much Everything Young Sportacus in Lazy Town''

References

External links
 

Hungarian male voice actors
20th-century Hungarian male actors
1994 births
Living people
Male actors from Budapest